Paweł Wojciechowski (born 24 April 1990) is a Polish professional footballer who plays as a forward for Resovia. From 2008-10, he played for Dutch club SC Heerenveen and for Willem II from 2010 until June 2012. He also played for the Poland U19 youth team.

Honours

FC Minsk
 Belarusian Cup: 2012–13

Zawisza Bydgoszcz
 Polish Cup: 2013–14

Career

Club
In February 2008, Promień Opalenica loaned him out to Heerenveen with a buy option. In late May, the Dutch club decided to sign him permanently. Wojciechowski made his first appearance in the Eredivisie against AZ Alkmaar on November 1, 2008, marking his debut with a goal. In May 2010, he was offered a two-year extension, on the condition that he spend the following season on loan at FC Emmen in the Dutch second division. Wojciechowski turned down the proposal.

In July 2010, he joined Eredivisie side Willem II on a free transfer, signing a two-year contract. He sustained a serious knee injury in a pre-season match.

References

External links 
 
 

1990 births
Living people
Sportspeople from Wrocław
Polish footballers
Poland youth international footballers
Association football forwards
Polish expatriate footballers
Expatriate footballers in the Netherlands
Expatriate footballers in Belarus
Polish expatriate sportspeople in the Netherlands
Eredivisie players
SC Heerenveen players
Willem II (football club) players
FC Minsk players
Zawisza Bydgoszcz players
FC Shakhtyor Soligorsk players
Chrobry Głogów players
Odra Opole players
Ruch Chorzów players
Górnik Łęczna players
Resovia (football) players
Ekstraklasa players
I liga players
II liga players